Aaron Hart may refer to:

 Aaron Hart (businessman) (1724–1800), businessman in Lower Canada
 Aaron Hart (rabbi) (1670–1756), chief rabbi of the United Kingdom
 Aaron Ezekiel Hart (1803–1857), the first Jewish lawyer in British North America